The Gospel of the Four Heavenly Realms is a lost text from the New Testament apocrypha.

The content has been surmised from various descriptions of it in ancient works by church fathers. It is thought to be a gnostic text, in which aspects of their esoteric cosmology were expounded, probably framed in the form of a dialogue between Jesus and the Apostles.

See also
List of Gospels

External links 
 

Four Heavenly Realms